Caroline County Courthouse is a historic county courthouse located at Bowling Green, Caroline County, Virginia. It was built about 1830, and is a two-story, four bay wide, brick temple form building in the Jeffersonian Roman Revival style.  The building is surrounded by a Tuscan entablature with a Tuscan pediment at either end. The front facade features an open arcade one-bay deep on the ground floor with six rounded arches.

It was listed on the National Register of Historic Places in 1973. It is included in the Bowling Green Historic District.

In front of the courthouse is the Caroline County Confederate Monument. On August 25, 2020, the Caroline County Board of Supervisors voted unanimously to remove it.

References

External links

Caroline County Courthouse, U.S. Route 301 & Courthouse Lane, Bowling Green, Caroline County, VA: 3 photos at Historic American Buildings Survey

County courthouses in Virginia
Courthouses on the National Register of Historic Places in Virginia
Government buildings completed in 1830
Buildings and structures in Caroline County, Virginia
National Register of Historic Places in Caroline County, Virginia
Historic American Buildings Survey in Virginia
Individually listed contributing properties to historic districts on the National Register in Virginia
1830 establishments in Virginia